The Ypsilon Golf Challenge was a golf tournament on the Challenge Tour that was played in 2008 at Ypsilon Golf Resort in Liberec, Czech Republic. It was hosted by European Tour player Alex Čejka and won by England's Seve Benson, who defeated Rafa Cabrera-Bello and Branden Grace in a playoff.

Winners

References

External links
Coverage on the Challenge Tour's official site

Former Challenge Tour events
Golf tournaments in the Czech Republic